Dai Tielang (17 October 1930 – 4 September 2019) was a Singaporean-born Chinese animator, best known for directing Black Cat Detective.

Born in Singapore in 1930, Dai was brought to China in 1940. After graduating from Beijing Film Academy in 1953, he worked in Shanghai Animation Film Studio.

Dai's father, Dai Langying was a native of Huiyang. He was a painter, and began to work in Singapore in the 1930s.

Works 
Where is Mama (1960)
A Deer of Nine Colors (1981)
Black Cat Detective (1984–1987)

References

External links 
Interview transcription
Historical Dictionary of Chinese Cinema
Hong Kong Movie Database - Mr. Black

1930 births
2019 deaths
Chinese animators
Chinese animated film directors
Beijing Film Academy alumni
Singaporean emigrants to China
Singaporean film directors
Chinese film directors